The 16th Filipino Academy of Movie Arts and Sciences Awards Night was held in 1968 for the Outstanding Achievements for the year 1967. 

Kapag Puso'y nasugatan of Virgo Film Productions won 8 FAMAS Awards including the FAMAS Award for Best Picture and Best actress for Marlene Dauden.

Awards

Major Awards
Winners are listed first and highlighted with boldface.

Special Awardee

Dr. Ciriaco Santiago Memorial Award 
Emmanuel Rojas

References

External links
FAMAS Awards 

FAMAS Award
FAMAS
FAMAS